The redoute de Gravelle (Gravelle redoubt) is a fort in Joinville-le-Pont,  situated to the south-east of Vincennes in Paris.  Built under Louis-Philippe, from 1968 it housed the École nationale de police de Paris (ENPP), before becoming an illegal immigrants detention centre.  Its south face is decorated with Auguste Arnaud's statue of a skirmisher, formerly placed next to one of a zouave on the old pont de l'Alma, but moved to its present position after the construction of the A4 autoroute in 1973.  The statue is visible from the A4.

History of Paris
Fortifications of Paris
Redoubts
Buildings and structures in Val-de-Marne